Allameh Tabatabaei High School, under supervision of Allameh Tabatabaei Complex of Cultural and Educational units (ATCCE), is a selective independent educational institution in Tehran, Iran, with six main campuses. It was registered as a High School, under the terms of the Ministry of Education Act of 26 May 1988 to prepare children for entering Iranian universities and to participate in National as well as International Science Olympiad competitions.

About 5,000 students apply for different campuses each year, but only about 5 to 10 percent of them can have the chance to be interviewed for registration. Allameh High School is also notable for the university-like building of the Abshenasan and Advanced branch.

Abshenasan primary school branch was established in 2013 near Abshenasan and Advance high school branches.

Campuses
The seven main ATCCE branches are:
 Advanced 
 North Kargar
 Fatemi
 Abshenasan
 Amirabad
 Abshenasan
 YousefAbad
 Pasdaran
 Dr. Shariati

References

External links
 Official website
 Official English website
 Mohammad Jafar Mostofi's website

High schools in Iran
Schools in Tehran